The Asia-Pacific Film Festival (abbreviated APFF) is an annual film festival hosted by the Federation of Motion Picture Producers in Asia-Pacific(FPA). The festival was first held in Tokyo, Japan, in 1954.

History 
The festival was first held in Tokyo, Japan, in 1954 as the Southeast Asian Film Festival(AFF). In addition to Japan, Hong Kong, the Federation of Malaya, the Philippines, Taiwan, and Thailand participated. The festival was subsequently held in a different country each year, and its name was changed to the Asia-Pacific Film Festival.From 1972 to 1976, the film festival was temporarily ran as a non competition film market, after acknowledging the over heating of competitions surrounding prizes by member states.

Best Film winners

References

External links 
 Asia-Pacific Film Festival on IMDb
Official site of the festival
Asian film awards
Film festivals held in multiple countries
Film festivals established in 1954
Awards established in 1954
1954 establishments in Japan